The Cyprus scops owl (Otus cyprius) is an owl endemic to Cyprus. Some taxonomists consider it to be a subspecies of the Eurasian scops owl.

References

Cyprus
Birds described in 1901